The 2004 Major League Soccer season culminated with D.C. United winning its fourth MLS Cup championship.

The biggest news in the beginning of the season was the signing of 14-year-old prodigy Freddy Adu, who made his debut as a substitute in United's season opener and scored his first goal several games later against the rival MetroStars. Adu contributed as a substitute on D.C.'s championship team, scoring five goals as the youngest player in North American sports history.

The season saw the emergence of forwards Brian Ching (San Jose) and Eddie Johnson (Dallas Burn) as formidable forwards, not only for their MLS teams, but for the United States national team as well. The two shared Golden Boot honors.

The Columbus Crew emerged as a dominant team in the second half of the regular season, running off an MLS-record 18-game unbeaten streak en route to the Supporters' Shield title, won after finishing level on points with Kansas City.

Final standings

Eastern Conference

Western Conference

Overall

Playoffs
In the playoffs, the Crew were taken down by the New England Revolution, who ended the Crew's streak in the opening leg, and goalkeeper Matt Reis, who saved two penalty kicks in the second leg. United cruised past the rival MetroStars (and league MVP Amado Guevara) 4–0 on aggregate in the other Eastern Conference semifinal.

In the Western Conference, Kansas City rallied from a 2–0 first-leg deficit for a dramatic 3–0 win in stoppage time over the defending MLS Cup champion San Jose Earthquakes in their conference semifinal. The Los Angeles Galaxy used a 2–0 home victory in the second leg to overcome the Colorado Rapids and goalie Joe Cannon, who had led the Rapids to a 1–0 victory in the opener.

In the conference finals, Kansas City used two goals from unsung forward Davy Arnaud, who enjoyed a breakout season, to beat the Galaxy and return to the final for the first time since 2000. D.C. United and New England hooked up in the Eastern Conference final in one of the best games in MLS playoff history. Playing at home, D.C. United took three different leads, only to see New England recover each time to tie the match 3–3 in a game full of highlight-reel goals. The match was finally decided by the first conventional shootout in MLS history, with Nick Rimando saving the first 'sudden death' penalty from Rookie of the Year Clint Dempsey to send D.C. to the championship.

In the second consecutive final held at the Home Depot Center, D.C. rebounded from an early Jose Burciaga goal by scoring three goals in eight minutes, including two from Alecko Eskandarian to take a 3–1 lead. In the second half, Dema Kovalenko became the first player to be sent off in an MLS Cup final after knocking a shot off the goal line with his hand. Although Josh Wolff converted the penalty kick, D.C. United held on with only 10 men to win its fourth championship in the nine-year history of MLS.

Play-off Bracket

MLS Cup Playoffs

Conference Semifinals 

New England Revolution advance 2–1 on aggregate.D.C. United advance 4–0 on aggregate.Kansas City Wizards advance 3–2 on aggregate.Los Angeles Galaxy advance 2–1 on aggregate.Conference finalsD.C. United advance 4–3 on penalties (3–3 after full time).''

MLS Cup 2004

D.C. United wins the MLS CupKansas City Wizards and D.C. United earn MLS berths toCONCACAF Champions' Cup 2005.

Team Awards

MLS Cup – D.C. United
U.S. Open Cup – Kansas City Wizards
MLS Supporters' Shield – Columbus Crew

Individual awards

Top goal scorers

Goal-Scoring Totals

Team Attendance Totals

Coaches

Eastern Conference
D.C. United: Piotr Nowak

Western Conference
Dallas Burn: Colin Clarke
Kansas City Wizards: Bob Gansler
San Jose Earthquakes: Dominic Kinnear

References

 
Major League Soccer seasons
1